Muricopsis suga is a species of sea snail, a marine gastropod mollusk in the family Muricidae, the murex snails or rock snails.

Subspecies
 Muricopsis suga discissus Houart, 1990
 Muricopsis suga suga (Fischer-Piette, 1942)

Description

Distribution
This marine species occurs off Senegal.

References

 Adanson, M., 1757 -Histoire naturelle du Sénégal. Coquillages, p. 275 p, 19 pls
 Fischer-Piette, E. (1942). Les mollusques d'Adanson. Journal de Conchyliologie, 85: 101–366, pls. 1–16
 Houart, R. & Vokes, E., 1986. An evaluation of the taxa Muricopsis and Risomurex (Gastropoda: Muricidae), with one new species of Risomurex. Tulane Studies in Geology and Paleontology 19(1): 63-90

External links
 MNHN, Paris: Muricopsis suga discissus Houart, 1990 (holotype)

Muricidae
Gastropods described in 1942